The Adventures of Mimi is the seventh video release by American singer and songwriter. Mariah Carey. It documented her 2006 summer concert tour, The Adventures of Mimi. It was released on Blu-ray disc on April 15, 2008. A new 2-DVD set was released April 16, 2008 in Japan. Also a 3 Disc Deluxe Edition was released on April 15, 2008.

History
The DVD was shot at her show in Anaheim, California on October 8, 2006 at Honda Center. It is Carey's first DVD release since #1's (1999), a compilation of music videos. The cover was photographed by Markus Klinko & Indrani.  Unlike the other concerts in the tour, Boyz II Men made a guest appearance to perform "One Sweet Day."

On December 1, 2008, The Adventures of Mimi was re-released as a four-disc box set, E=MC² Adventure Box, also containing the album E=MC². The box set also includes a double-sided poster with one tour photo and one album photo, and a special logo key ring.

Critical reception

Track listing

Charts and certifications

References

2007 video albums
Mariah Carey video albums
Live video albums
2007 live albums